Dabinderjit Singh Sidhu (Punjabi: ਦਬਿੰਦਰਜੀਤ ਸਿੰਘ ਸਿੱਧੂ) was a Director at the National Audit Office (United Kingdom) before he retired early in May 2022 after more than 33 years service, having become the NAO's youngest Director in 2000.  He is an internationally known and well respected Sikh activist and spokesman for Sikh rights and interests.
He was awarded an OBE in 2000 for his work on equal opportunities.

Protection of Sikh rights and interests
Singh has acted as a spokesman for the Sikh Secretariat, formed in 2001, and has been the Principal Adviser of the Sikh Federation (UK), a non-governmental organisation formed in September 2003 to encourage Sikhs to participate in mainstream politics and to protect the rights and promote the interests of the hundreds of thousands of Sikhs in the UK.

He was a founding member of the Sikh Network set up in September 2014 that has become associated with the highly acclaimed Sikh Manifesto. 

Documents declassified by the UK Government in January 2014 under the 30-year rule and released to the National Archives revealed Margaret Thatcher authorised an SAS officer to visit India in February 1984 and assist the Indian authorities in planning the attack on the Harmandir Sahib (Golden Temple) Complex.  Singh and the Sikh Federation (UK) have led demands for a full public inquiry into British involvement that is expected to be commissioned by a Labour Government.   

Singh was one of two witnesses who successfully argued in June 2018 in a three-day hearing of the First Tier Tribunal (Information Rights) that UK Government papers should be released in the public interest. Judge Murray Shanks in his ruling rejected the UK government’s argument that declassifying the Downing Street papers would hurt diplomatic ties with India. 

Singh, although never a member, was associated with the International Sikh Youth Federation (ISYF) as he wore a jacket with a small ISYF emblem at his investiture at Buckingham Palace in December 2000 when he received hs OBE from HM Queen. The ISYF was controversially proscribed in the UK in March 2001, followed by India in December 2001 and Canada in July 2003. In the UK the organisation suspended its membership that reached a high of around 25,000 in 1985 and national and local structures to legally challenge the proscription.  In March 2016 following a legal challenge the UK Government lifted the ban on the ISYF in the UK and in May 2016 all restrictions were removed across the EU.

The Vancouver Sun, reported in February 2008 that Dabinderjit Singh was in Canada promoting a Sikh Agenda for the Canadian Government. Dabinderjit Singh clarified he was not on a speaking tour, but on a family holiday to Canada and the USA and spoke at a Gurdwara and one other event where he encouraged Sikhs in Canada to engage in mainstream politics to bring about change. The alleged agenda included challenging the proscription of Sikh organisations in Canada.

He was appointed to the board of Transport for London in 2006, under former Mayor Ken Livingstone, and served until 2008.

Life peerage controversially blocked

Singh was nominated for a life peerage by Keir Starmer in early November 2020.  He was cleared by the House of Lords Appointments Commission (HOLAC) on 3 December 2020, recommended by the Prime Minister and the peerage approved by HM Queen for a public announcement expected on 22 December 2020.  HIs name was leaked and minutes before the public announcement his name was controversially put on hold by the Cabinet Office following a request by Keir Starmer’s office.  

His name was expected to appear in the next public announcement of political peerages, but when the next round of political peerages came on 14 October 2022, after a considerable delay, his name was missing.  The Metropolitan Police is currently investigating malicious communications on 22 December 2020 and Singh is expected to take legal action highlighting bad faith and misconduct.

National Audit Office career

He was employed at the National Audit Office from 1 September 1988 until 6 May 2022.

The National Audit Office is not part of Government; therefore Singh was not a civil servant but in a politically restricted role.

In November 2000, the National Audit Office reported that Singh ("known as Sid Sidhu to his colleagues") had been promoted to Director.  (NAO Focus Issue 9).  Since 2000 NAO has published one further reference to Singh under the name Dabinderjit Singh. All other references have used the alias 'Sid Sidhu'.

In March 2004 he was appointed the first Chair of the EU College of External Auditors for the European Defence Agency.  By summer 2007 he no longer held this post.

See also 
Sikh Federation (UK)

References

External links 
National Audit Office

English Sikhs
Year of birth missing (living people)
Living people
Officers of the Order of the British Empire
British Sikhs